Patrick Casanova (born 13 September 1976) is an Italian former rower. He competed in the men's eight event at the 1996 Summer Olympics.

References

External links
 

1976 births
Living people
Italian male rowers
Olympic rowers of Italy
Rowers at the 1996 Summer Olympics
Rowers from Rome